I Loved a Soldier (also known as Invitation to Happiness) is an unfinished 1936 American romantic-comedy-drama film directed by Henry Hathaway and produced by Paramount Pictures. It stars Marlene Dietrich, Charles Boyer, Walter Catlett, Lionel Stander, and Margaret Sullavan.

The Paramount picture was intended to be a remake of Pola Negri's 1927 Hotel Imperial, which was based on a play by Lajos Bíró. Film shooting began in early January 1936 where the film was officially named Invitation to Happiness. Early on into the shooting, there was an accident with a gun that injured one of the crew members and almost hit Boyer, singeing his toupée. That same day, the movie's title was changed to I loved a Soldier for unknown reasons.

As a result of problems with the script and on-set altercations between Dietrich and Hathaway, producer Ernst Lubitsch suspended production on the film several weeks into shooting. In March, Paramount announced that they and Dietrich were "amicable and friendly" again, and production of the film would continue with Margaret Sullavan as Dietrich's replacement. Recast with new actors, the film was completed in 1939 under the title Hotel Imperial. No footage shot for I Loved a Soldier was used in the final film and no footage of I Loved a Soldier is known to have survived.

Plot 

The film tells the story of a young servant girl (Marlene Dietrich) who works at Hotel Imperial. One day, she falls in love with a known customer who turns out be a soldier (Charles Boyer), locally known as the ultimate ladies man.

Cast
 Marlene Dietrich
 Charles Boyer
 Walter Catlett		
 Lionel Stander		
 Margaret Sullavan		
 Akim Tamiroff

See also
 The Witching Hour
 The Shepherd of the Hills
 Now and Forever

References

External links 
 

American black-and-white films
1930s English-language films
American films based on plays
1930s unfinished films
Films directed by Henry Hathaway
Sound film remakes of silent films
Paramount Pictures films
1936 drama films